Lara Elena Donnelly, (born 1990) is an American author of speculative fiction. She is a graduate of the 2012 Clarion Workshop. Her short fiction and poetry have appeared in Strange Horizons, Mythic Delirium, Escape Pod, Nightmare Magazine, and Uncanny Magazine.

Her debut novel, Amberlough, was published by Tor Books in February 2017, and was nominated for the 2017 Nebula Award for Best Novel, the 2017 Lambda Literary Award and included on the 2017 Locus Recommended Reading List. The sequel, Armistice, was published by Tor in May 2018. The third title in the Amberlough Dossier, Amnesty, followed in April 2019. In 2020 Donnelly sold her next novel, Base Notes to Thomas & Mercer, which was published in February 2022.

Bibliography

Novels

The Amberlough Dossier
 Amberlough (Tor Books, 2017) 
 Armistice (Tor Books, 2018) 
 Amnesty (Tor Books, 2019)

Stand-alone
 Base Notes (Thomas & Mercer, 2022)

Short fiction 
 "Making Us Monsters" (Uncanny Magazine, 2017) Written with Sam J. Miller

Comics 
''Jim Henson's Labyrinth: Masquerade #1 (Boom! Studios, 2020)

References

External links 
 
 Lara Elena Donnelly at the Internet Speculative Fiction Database

Living people
American speculative fiction writers
21st-century American women writers
American women short story writers
American women poets
American women novelists
21st-century American short story writers
21st-century American poets
21st-century American novelists
1990 births